Below is a list of former parliamentary constituencies in Essex and details of them. These details include their modern equivalent, date of existence and any other relevant information.

Former Seats 1983-1997

Colchester North
Modern Equivalent and successor: Colchester and North Essex
Predecessor: Colchester
Elections fought: 1983, 1987, 1992
Type of seat: Conservative safe
Member(s) of Parliament: 
Antony Buck (1983 - 1992), Conservative
Bernard Jenkin (1992 - 1997), Conservative

Colchester South and Maldon
Modern Equivalent and successor: Maldon and East Chelmsford
Predecessor: Maldon
Elections fought: 1983, 1987, 1992
Type of seat: Conservative safe
Member(s) of Parliament: John Wakeham (1983 - 1997), Conservative

Rochford
Modern Equivalent and successor: Rayleigh
Predecessor: South East Essex
Elections fought: 1983, 1987, 1992
Type of seat: Conservative safe
Member(s) of Parliament: Michael Clark (1983 - 1997), Conservative

Southend East
Modern Equivalent and successor: Rochford and Southend East
Elections fought: 1918 to 1992
Type of seat: Conservative safe
Member(s) of Parliament: Henry Channon (1983 - 1997), Conservative

Former Seats 1955-1974

Billericay
Modern Equivalent: Billericay and Brentwood and Ongar
Successor: Brentwood and Ongar
Elections fought: 1950 to 1970
Type of seat: Conservative safe (1950s) and marginal (1960s and 1970s)
Member(s) of Parliament:
Richard Body (1955 - 1959), Conservative
Edward Gardner (1959 - 1966), Conservative
Eric Moonman (1966 - 1970), Labour
Robert McCrindle (1970 - 1974), Conservative

Chigwell
Modern Equivalent and successor: Epping Forest
Elections fought: 1955 to 1970
Type of seat: Conservative
Member(s) of Parliament: John Biggs-Davison (1955 - 1974), Conservative

Epping
Modern Equivalent and successor: Epping Forest and Harlow
Elections fought: 1885 to 1970
Type of seat: Conservative marginal (bellwether constituency)
Member(s) of Parliament:
Graeme Bell Finlay (1955 - 1964), Conservative
Stanley Newens (1964 - 1970), Labour
Norman Tebbit (1970 - 1974), Conservative

Parliamentary constituencies in Essex (historic)
Former parliamentary constituencies